The Monticello North Main Street Historic District is a predominantly residential historic district on the north side of Monticello, Arkansas.  Most of the twenty buildings in the district were built between 1880 and 1910, during a period of expansion and prosperity in the area.  Popular styles of the period, including Queen Anne and Colonial Revival, are represented in the district, and there are three churches.  Three houses were designed by architect S. C. Hotchkiss, who lived in Monticello for a number of years.

The district was listed on the National Register of Historic Places in 1979.

See also
National Register of Historic Places listings in Drew County, Arkansas

References

Historic districts on the National Register of Historic Places in Arkansas
Greek Revival architecture in Arkansas
Queen Anne architecture in Arkansas
Neoclassical architecture in Arkansas
Geography of Drew County, Arkansas
National Register of Historic Places in Drew County, Arkansas